Urusei Yatsura is a Japanese manga series written and illustrated Rumiko Takahashi that premiered in Weekly Shōnen Sunday in 1978 and ran sporadically until its conclusion in 1987. It follows the humorous adventures of Ataru Moroboshi, and the alien Lum, who believes she is Ataru's wife after he accidentally proposes to her. A total of 34 individual volumes with 11 chapters each were released in tankōbon format between 1980 and March 1987. The series was printed in 15 wideban editions between July 1989 and August 1990. A bunkoban edition of the series was released over 17 volumes between August 1998 and December 1999. A "My First Big" edition was printed between July 2000 and September 2004. A shinsōban edition over 34 volumes was released between November 17, 2006 and March 18, 2008.

After requests from fans, Viz Media licensed the series for release in English across North America in 1989 under the title of Lum * Urusei Yatsura. They released it in a monthly comic book format that contained two stories per issue. Despite a strong start, the series was dropped after eight issues and one graphic novel in 1990. The manga was then reintroduced in Viz's monthly Animerica magazine and was retitled The Return of Lum Urusei Yatsura because of the long gap. The monthly comic books and collected graphic novels resumed in 1994 and 1995 respectively. The English release stopped in 2000 after eight graphic novels. Viz's release roughly corresponded to the first 11 volumes of the Japanese tankōbon edition, but with several chapters excluded.

On July 19, 2018, Viz announced that they re-licensed the manga with plans to release it in a 2-in-1 omnibus edition with new translations. Based on the Japanese shinsōban, the first volume was published on February 19, 2019, and the seventeenth and last on February 19, 2023.

Volume list

Tankōbon edition

Shinsōban edition

References

External links
 Chapter summaries at Furinkan.com
 Urusei Yatsura manga at Viz Media

Chapters
Urusei Yatsura